The Good Life is a 2008 Chilean drama film directed by Andrés Wood and written by Mamoun Hassan. The film won the 2008 Goya Award for Best Spanish Language Foreign Film.

Plot 
Teresa (Aline Küppenheim), Edmundo (Roberto Farias), Mario (Eduardo Paxeco), and Patricia (Paula Sotelo) are four inhabitants of the city of Santiago de Chile whose lives intersect in public places but rarely come together to communicate.

Immersed in the urban whirlwind, each of them pursues a goal: Teresa, a social psychologist who helps women in situations of risk; Edmundo, a stylist who still lives with his mother and longs to have a car; Mario, a young clarinetist who arrives from Berlin and wants to join the Philharmonic; and Patricia, who struggles to survive while caring for a baby and battling illness.

Four stories based on real events, very different from each other but united by the ups and downs and contradictions of life in a South American city.

Cast 
 Aline Küppenheim - Teresa
 Roberto Farías - Edmundo
  - Mario
 Paula Sotelo - Patricia
 Alfredo Castro - Jorge
 Manuela Martelli - Paula
 Francisco Acuña - Lucas
 Bélgica Castro - Leonor

Awards and nominations

Won
Goya Awards
Best Spanish Language Foreign Film

Havana Film Festival
Mention (Andrés Wood)

Huelva Latin American Film Festival
Golden Colon: Best Film (Andrés Wood)

References

External links 

2008 films
Chilean drama films
Films directed by Andrés Wood
2000s Spanish-language films
2008 drama films